Petit David Minkoumba (born 27 February 1989) is a Cameroonian weightlifter.

He competed at the 2016 Summer Olympics in Rio de Janeiro, in the men's 94 kg. He competed at world championships, most recently at the 2009 World Weightlifting Championships.

In April 2018, he was one of eight Cameroonian athletes who went missing from their accommodation during the 2018 Commonwealth Games.

Major results

References

1989 births
Living people
Cameroonian male weightlifters
Olympic weightlifters of Cameroon
Weightlifters at the 2016 Summer Olympics
Weightlifters at the 2010 Commonwealth Games
Weightlifters at the 2014 Commonwealth Games
Weightlifters at the 2018 Commonwealth Games
Commonwealth Games competitors for Cameroon
20th-century Cameroonian people
21st-century Cameroonian people